The 2003–04 Rochdale A.F.C. season was the club's 83rd season in the Football League, and the 30th consecutive season in the fourth tier (League Division Three). Rochdale finished the season in 21st place.

Statistics
																												
				
				
				
				
				
				
				
				
				
				
				
				
				
				
				
				
				
				
				
				
				
				
				
				
				
				
				
				
				
				
				
				
				
				
				
				

|}

League Division Three

FA Cup

League Cup

League Trophy

References

Rochdale A.F.C. seasons
2003–04 Football League Third Division by team